The Tiger I was a German heavy tank of World War II that operated beginning in 1942 in Africa and in the Soviet Union, usually in independent heavy tank battalions. It gave the German Army its first armoured fighting vehicle that mounted the 8.8 cm KwK 36 gun (derived from the 8.8 cm Flak 36). 1,347 were built between August 1942 and August 1944. After August 1944, production of the Tiger I was phased out in favour of the Tiger II.

While the Tiger I has been called an outstanding design for its time, it has also been called overengineered, using expensive materials and labour-intensive production methods. In the early period Tiger was prone to certain types of track failures and breakdowns and was in general limited in range by its high fuel consumption. It was expensive to maintain, but generally mechanically reliable. It was difficult to transport and vulnerable to immobilisation when mud, ice, and snow froze between its overlapping and interleaved Schachtellaufwerk-pattern road wheels, often jamming them solid. This was a problem on the Eastern Front in the muddy rasputitsa season and during periods of extreme cold.

The tank was given its nickname "Tiger" by Ferdinand Porsche, and the Roman numeral was added after the Tiger II entered production. The initial designation was Panzerkampfwagen VI Ausführung H (literally "armoured combat vehicle VI version H", abbreviated PzKpfw VI Ausf. H) where 'H' denoted Henschel as the designer/manufacturer. It was classified with ordnance inventory designation Sd.Kfz. 182. The tank was later re-designated as PzKpfw VI Ausf. E in March 1943, with ordnance inventory designation Sd.Kfz. 181.

Today, only nine Tiger I tanks survive in museums and private collections worldwide. , Tiger 131 (captured during the North Africa Campaign) at the UK's Tank Museum is the only example restored to running order.

Design history

Earlier designs
Henschel & Sohn began the development of a large tank design in January 1937 when the Waffenamt requested Henschel to develop a Durchbruchwagen ("breakthrough vehicle") in the 30–33 tonne range. Only one prototype hull was ever built, and it was never fitted with a turret. The Durchbruchwagen I's general shape and suspension resembled the Panzer III, while the turret resembled the early Panzer IV C turret with the short-barrelled 7.5 cm L/24 cannon.

Before Durchbruchwagen I was completed, a request was issued for a heavier 30-tonne class vehicle with thicker armour, the Durchbruchwagen II, which would have had 50 mm (2 in) of frontal armour and mounted a Panzer IV turret with a short-barrelled (24 calibres long) 7.5 cm KwK 37 gun. The overall weight would have been 36  tonnes. Only one hull was built, and no turret was fitted. Further development of the Durchbruchwagen was dropped in 1938 in favour of the larger and better-armoured VK 30.01 (H) and VK 36.01 (H) designs. Both the Durchbruchwagen I and II prototype hulls were used as test vehicles until 1941.

Another attempt

The VK 30.01 (H) medium tank and the VK 36.01 (H) heavy tank designs pioneered the use of the complex Schachtellaufwerk track suspension system of torsion bar-sprung, overlapped and interleaved main road wheels for tank use. This concept was already standard on German half-tracks such as the Sd. Kfz. 7. The VK 30.01 (H) was intended to mount a low-velocity 7.5  cm L/24 infantry support gun, a 7.5  cm L/40 dual-purpose anti-tank gun, or a 10.5  cm L/28 field gun in a Krupp turret. Overall weight was to be 33 tonnes. The armour was designed to be 50  mm on frontal surfaces and 30  mm on the side surfaces. Four prototype hulls were completed for testing. Two of these were later modified to build the "Sturer Emil" (12.8  cm Selbstfahrlafette L/61) self-propelled anti-tank gun.

The VK 36.01 (H) was intended to weigh 40 tonnes, with 100  mm (4  in) of armour on front surfaces, 80  mm on turret sides and 60  mm on the hull sides. The VK 36.01 (H) was intended to carry a 7.5  cm L/24, a 7.5  cm L/43, or a 7.5  cm L/70, or a 12.8  cm L/28 cannon in a Krupp turret that looked similar to an enlarged Panzer IV Ausf. C turret. The hull for one prototype was built, followed later by five more. The six turrets built were never fitted and were used as part of the Atlantic Wall. The VK 36.01 (H) project was discontinued in early 1942 in favour of the VK 45.01 project.

Further improvements
Combat experience against the French SOMUA S35 cavalry tank and Char B1 heavy tank, and the British Matilda II infantry tanks during the Battle of France in June 1940 showed that the German Army needed better armed and armoured tanks.

On 26 May 1941, Henschel and Ferdinand Porsche were asked to submit designs for a 45-tonne heavy tank, to be ready by June 1942. Porsche worked on an updated version of their VK 30.01 (P) Leopard tank prototype while Henschel worked on an improved VK 36.01 (H) tank. Henschel built two prototypes: a VK 45.01 (H) H1 with an 8.8 cm L/56 cannon, and a VK 45.01 (H) H2 with a 7.5 cm L/70 cannon.

Final designs
On 22 June 1941, Germany launched Operation Barbarossa, the invasion of the Soviet Union. The Germans were encountering large numbers of Soviet T-34 medium and KV-1 heavy tanks, that were surviving the German attack. According to Henschel designer Erwin Aders: "There was great consternation when it was discovered that the Soviet tanks were superior to anything available to the Heer."

Weight increase to 45  tonnes and an increase in gun calibre to 8.8  cm were ordered. The due date for the new prototypes was set for 20 April 1942, Adolf Hitler's 53rd birthday. Unlike the Panther tank, the designs did not incorporate sloped armour.

Porsche and Henschel submitted prototype designs, each making use of the Krupp-designed turret. They were demonstrated at Rastenburg in front of Hitler. The Henschel design was accepted, mainly because the Porsche VK 4501 (P) prototype design used a troubled petrol-electric transmission system which needed large quantities of copper for the manufacture of its electrical drivetrain components, a strategic war material of which Germany had limited supplies with acceptable electrical properties for such uses. Production of the Panzerkampfwagen VI Ausf. H began in August 1942. Expecting an order for his tank, Porsche built 100 chassis. After the contract was awarded to Henschel, they were used for a new turretless, casemate-style tank destroyer; 91 hulls were converted into the       Panzerjäger Tiger (P) in early 1943.

The Tiger was still at the prototype stage when it was first hurried into service, and therefore changes both large and small were made throughout the production run. A redesigned turret with a lower cupola was the most significant change. The river-fording submersion capability and an external air-filtration system were dropped to cut costs.

Design
The Tiger differed from earlier German tanks principally in its design philosophy. Its predecessors balanced mobility, armour and firepower and were sometimes outgunned by their opponents.

While heavy, this tank was not slower than the best of its opponents. Although the general design and layout were broadly similar to the previous medium tank, the Panzer IV, the Tiger weighed more than twice as much. This was due to its substantially thicker armour, the larger main gun, greater volume of fuel and ammunition storage, larger engine, and a more solidly built transmission and suspension.

Armour

Armour plates were mostly flat, with interlocking construction. This flat construction encouraged angling the Tiger hull roughly 30-45° when firing in order to increase effective thickness. The armour joints were stepped and welded rather than riveted and were made of maraging steel.

Gun

The 56-calibre long 8.8 cm KwK 36 was chosen for the Tiger. A combination of a flat trajectory from the high muzzle velocity and precision from the Leitz Turmzielfernrohr TZF 9b sight (later replaced by the monocular TZF 9c) made it very accurate. Compared with the other contemporary German tank guns, the 8.8 cm KwK 36 had superior penetration to the 7.5 cm KwK 40 on the Sturmgeschütz III and Panzer IV but inferior to the 7.5 cm KwK 42 on the Panther tank under ranges of 2,500 metres. At greater ranges, the 8.8 cm KwK 36 was superior in penetration and accuracy. The gun took around 10.9 seconds to reload.

The ammunition for the Tiger had electrically fired primers. Four types of ammunition were available but not all were fully available; the PzGr 40 shell used tungsten, which was in short supply as the war progressed.

PzGr. 39 (armour-piercing, capped, ballistic cap)
PzGr. 40 (armour-piercing, composite rigid)
Hl. Gr. 39 (high explosive anti-tank)
sch. Sprgr. Patr. L/4.5 (incendiary shrapnel)

Engine and drive

The rear of the tank held an engine compartment flanked by two separate rear compartments each containing a fuel tank and radiator. The Germans had not developed an adequate diesel engine, so a petrol (gasoline) powerplant had to be used instead. The original engine utilized was a 21.35-litre (1303 cu.in.) 12-cylinder Maybach HL210 P45 developing 485 kW (650 hp) at 3,000 rpm and a top speed of 38km (24mph.) It was determined to be underpowered for the vehicle from the 251st Tiger onwards. It was replaced by the upgraded HL 230 P45, a 23.095 litre (1409 cu.in.) engine developing 521 kW (700 hp) at 3,000 rpm. The main difference between these engines was that the original Maybach HL 210 used an aluminium engine block while the Maybach HL 230 used a cast-iron engine block. The cast-iron block allowed for larger cylinders (and thus, greater displacement) which increased the power output to 521 kW (700 hp). The engine was in V-form, with two cylinder banks set at 60 degrees. An inertia starter was mounted on its right side, driven via chain gears through a port in the rear wall. The engine could be lifted out through a hatch on the rear hull roof. In comparison to other V12 and various vee-form gasoline engines used for tanks, the eventual HL 230 engine was nearly four litres smaller in displacement than the Allied British Rolls-Royce Meteor V12 AFV power plant, itself adapted from the RR Merlin but de-rated to 448 kW (600 hp) power output; and the American Ford-designed precursor V12 to its Ford GAA V-8 AFV engine of 18 litre displacement, which in its original V12 form would have had the same 27 litre displacement as the Meteor.

The 501st Heavy Panzer Battalion (sPzAbt 501) reported in May 1943:

The engine drove the front sprockets through a drivetrain connecting to a transmission in the front portion of the lower hull; the front sprockets had to be mounted relatively low as a result. The Krupp-designed 11-tonne turret had a hydraulic motor whose pump was powered by mechanical drive from the engine. A full rotation took about a minute.

Another new feature was the Maybach-Olvar hydraulically controlled semi-automatic pre-selector gearbox. The extreme weight of the tank also required a new steering system. Germany's Argus Motoren, where Hermann Klaue had invented a ring brake in 1940, supplied them for the Arado Ar 96 and also supplied the 55 cm disc. Klaue was acknowledged in the patent application that he had improved, it can even be traced back to British designs dating to 1904. It is unclear whether Klaue's patent ring brake was utilised in the Tiger brake design.

The clutch-and-brake system, typical for lighter vehicles, was retained only for emergencies. Normally, steering depended on a double differential, Henschel's development of the British Merritt-Brown system first encountered in the Churchill tank. The vehicle had an eight-speed gearbox, and the steering offered two fixed radii of turns on each gear, thus the Tiger had sixteen different radii of turn. In neutral gear, the tracks could be turned in opposite directions, so the Tiger I pivoted in place. There was a steering wheel instead of either a tiller – or, as most tanks had at that time, twin braking levers – making the Tiger I's steering system easy to use, and ahead of its time.

Powered turret traverse was provided by the variable speed Boehringer-Sturm L4 hydraulic motor, which was driven from the main engine by a secondary drive shaft. On early production versions of the Tiger maximum turret traverse was limited to 6º/second, whilst on later versions a selectable high speed traverse gear was added. Thus, the turret could be rotated 360 degrees at up to 6º/second in low gear independent of engine rpm (same as on early production versions), or up to 19º/second with the high-speed setting and engine at 2000 rpm, and at over 36º/second at the maximum allowable engine speed of 3000 rpm. The direction and speed of traverse was controlled by the gunner through foot pedals, the speed of traverse corresponding to the level of depression the gunner applied to the foot pedal. This system allowed for very precise control of powered traverse, a light touch on the pedal resulting in a minimum traverse speed of 0.1 deg/sec (360 degrees in 60 min), unlike in most other tanks of the time (e.g., US M4 Sherman or Soviet T-34) this allowed for fine laying of the gun without the gunner needing to use his traverse handwheel.

Suspension

The suspension used sixteen torsion bars, with eight suspension arms per side. To save space, the swing arms were leading on one side and trailing on the other side; this is called an H suspension setup. There were three road wheels (one of them double, closest to the track's centre) on each arm, in a so-called Schachtellaufwerk overlapping and interleaved arrangement, similar to that pioneered on German half-tracked military vehicles of the pre-World War II era, with the Tiger I being the first all-tracked German AFV built in quantity to use such a road wheel arrangement.

Removing an inner wheel that had lost its solid rubber tire (a common occurrence) required the removal of up to nine other wheels first. During the rainy period that brought on the autumn rasputitsa mud season and onwards into the winter conditions on the Eastern front, the roadwheels of a Schachtellaufwerk-equipped vehicle could also become packed with mud or snow that could then freeze. Presumably, German engineers, based on the experience of the half-tracks, felt that the improvement in off-road performance, track and wheel life, mobility with wheels missing or damaged, plus additional protection from enemy fire was worth the maintenance difficulties of a complex system vulnerable to mud and ice. This approach was carried on, in various forms, to the Panther and the non-interleaved wheel design for the Tiger II. Eventually, a new 80 cm diameter 'steel' wheel design, closely resembling those on the Tiger II, with an internally sprung steel-rim tire was substituted, and which like the Tiger II, were only overlapped and not interleaved.

The track replacement and wheel removal took 30 minutes for each side of the tank. However, in service, Tigers were frequently transported by rail with their combat tracks fitted, as long as the train crew knew there were no narrow tunnels or other obstructions on the route that would prevent an oversized load from passing, despite this practice being strictly forbidden.

Fording system

This required unusual mechanisms for ventilation and cooling when underwater. At least 30 minutes of set-up time was required, with the turret and gun being locked in the forward position, and a large snorkel tube raised at the rear. An inflatable doughnut-shaped ring sealed the turret ring. The two rear compartments (each containing a fuel tank, radiator and fans) were floodable. However, this ability was found to be of limited practical value for its high cost and was removed from production lines in August 1943. As a result, only the first 495 units were fitted with this deep fording system; all later models were capable of fording water only two metres deep.

Crew compartment
The internal layout was typical of German tanks. Forward was an open crew compartment, with the driver and radio-operator seated at the front on either side of the gearbox. Behind them the turret floor was surrounded by panels forming a continuous level surface. This helped the loader to retrieve the ammunition, which was mostly stowed above the tracks. Three men were seated in the turret; the loader to the right of the gun facing to the rear, the gunner to the left of the gun, and the commander behind him. There was also a folding seat on the right for the loader. The turret had a full circular floor and 157 cm headroom.  Early versions of the Tiger I's turret included two pistol ports; however, one of these was replaced with a loader escape hatch and the other was removed from later designs.

Post-war testing by the Allies found the tank to be uncomfortable and spartan. For example, the gunner suffered from clumsy controls and a cramped area. This was in contrast to German crews who found them to be spacious and comfortable.

Cost
A substantial problem with the Tiger was that its production required considerable resources in terms of manpower and material, which led to it being expensive: the Tiger I cost over twice as much as a Panzer IV and four times as much as a StuG III assault gun. Partly because of their high cost, only 1,347 Tiger I and 492 Tiger II tanks were produced. The closest counterpart to the Tiger from the United States was the M26 Pershing (around 200 deployed to the European Theater of Operations (ETO) during the war) and the IS-2 from the USSR (about 3,800 built during the conflict).

From a technical point of view it was better suited compared to its contemporaries. Despite the low number produced, shortages in qualified crew and the considerable fuel requirement in a context of ever shrinking resources, Tiger tanks had a large impact in the war with Tigers (including Tiger IIs) destroying at least 10,300 enemy tanks, and 11,380 AT guns and artillery pieces in WW2. This was achieved for the loss of 1,725 Tigers (including large numbers of operational and strategic losses, i.e. abandoned, broken down, etc.).

Production history

Production of the Tiger I began in August 1942 at the factory of Henschel und Sohn in Kassel, initially at a rate of 25 per month and peaking in April 1944 at 104 per month. An official document of the time stated that the first Tiger I was completed on 4 August. 1,355 had been built by August 1944, when production ceased. Deployed Tiger I's peaked at 671 on 1 July 1944. It took about twice as long to build a Tiger I as another German tank of the period. When the improved Tiger II began production in January 1944, the Tiger I was soon phased out.

In 1943, Japan bought several specimens of German tank designs for study. A single Tiger I was apparently purchased, along with a Panther and two Panzer IIIs, but only the Panzer IIIs were actually delivered. The undelivered Tiger was loaned to the German Wehrmacht by the Japanese government.

Many modifications were introduced during the production run to improve automotive performance, firepower and protection. Simplification of the design was implemented, along with cuts due to raw material shortages. In 1942 alone, at least six revisions were made, starting with the removal of the Vorpanzer (frontal armour shield) from the pre-production models in April. In May, mudguards bolted onto the side of the pre-production run were added, while removable mudguards saw full incorporation in September. Smoke discharge canisters, three on each side of the turret, were added in August 1942. In later years, similar changes and updates were added, such as the addition of Zimmerit (a non-magnetic anti-mine coating), in late 1943. Due to slow production rates at the factories, incorporation of the new modifications could take several months.

The humorous and somewhat racy crew manual, the Tigerfibel, was the first of its kind for the German Army and its success resulted in more unorthodox manuals that attempted to emulate its style.

Variants

Among other variants of the Tiger, a heavily armoured casemate self-propelled rocket projector, today commonly known as the Sturmtiger, was built, which mounted a 38 cm/15in rocket launcher. A tank recovery version of the Porsche Tiger I (Bergetiger), and one Porsche Tiger I, was issued to the 654th Heavy Tank Destroyer Battalion, which was equipped with the Ferdinand/Elefant.
In Italy, a demolition carrier version of the Tiger I without a main gun was built by maintenance crews in an effort to find a way to clear minefields. It is often misidentified as a BergeTiger recovery vehicle. As many as three may have been built. It carried a demolition charge on a small crane on the turret in place of the main gun. It was to move up to a minefield and drop the charge, back away, and then set the charge off to clear the minefield. There is no verification of any being used in combat.

Another variant was the Fahrschulpanzer VI Tiger tanks (driving school Tiger tanks). These tanks were Tigers with modified engines to run on either compressed Towngas gas (Stadtgas System) or wood gas (Holzgas System). This was due to shortages in fuel supply. They used a mixture of turreted and turretless hulls. They were used to train Tiger tank crews, and were not used in combat.

Designations

Hitler's order, dated 27 February 1944, abolished the designation Panzerkampfwagen VI and ratified Panzerkampfwagen Tiger Ausf. E, which was the official designation until the end of the war. For common use it was frequently shortened to Tiger.

Combat history

Gun and armour performance

A report prepared by the Waffenamt-Prüfwesen 1 gave the calculated probability of perforation at range, on which various adversaries would be defeated reliably at a side angle of 30 degrees to the incoming round.

The M4 Sherman's 75 mm gun would not penetrate the Tiger frontally at any range, and needed to be within 100 m to achieve a side penetration against the 80 mm upper hull superstructure. The Sherman's upgraded 76 mm gun might penetrate the Tiger's driver's front plate from 600 m, the nose from 400 m and the turret front from 700 m. The M3 90 mm cannon used as a towed anti-aircraft and anti-tank gun, and later mounted in the M36 tank destroyer and finally the late-war M26 Pershing, could penetrate the Tiger's front plate at a range of 1,000 m using standard ammunition, and from beyond 2,000 m when using HVAP.

Soviet ground trial testing conducted in May 1943 determined that the 8.8 cm KwK 36 gun could pierce the T-34/76 frontal beam nose from 1500 m, and the front hull from 1500 m. A hit to the driver's hatch would force it to collapse inwards and break apart.

However, according to Steven Zaloga, the IS-2 and Tiger I could each knock the other out in normal combat distances below 1,000 m. At longer ranges, the performance of each respective tank against each other was dependent on the crew and the combat situation.

When engaging targets, Tiger crews were encouraged to angle the hull to the 10:30 or 1:30 clock position (45 degrees) relative to the target, an orientation referred to as the Mahlzeit Stellung. This would maximize the effective front hull armour to 180mm and side hull to 140mm, making the Tiger impervious to any Allied gun up to 152 mm. The Tiger's lack of slope for its armour made angling the hull by manual means simple and effective, and unlike the lighter Panzer IV and Panther tanks, the Tiger's thick side armour gave a degree of confidence of immunity from flank attacks. The tank was also immune to Soviet anti-tank rifle fire to the sides and rear. Its large calibre 8.8 cm provided superior fragmentation and high explosive content over the 7.5 cm KwK 42 gun. Therefore, comparing the Tiger with the Panther, for supporting the infantry and destroying fortifications, the Tiger offered superior firepower. It was also key to dealing with towed anti-tank guns, according to German tank commander Otto Carius:

First actions

Eager to make use of the powerful new weapon, Hitler ordered the vehicle be pressed into service months earlier than had been planned. A platoon of four Tigers went into action on 23 September 1942 near Leningrad. Operating in swampy, forested terrain, their movement was largely confined to roads and tracks, making defence against them far easier. Many of these early models were plagued by problems with the transmission, which had difficulty handling the great weight of the vehicle if pushed too hard. It took time for drivers to learn how to avoid overtaxing the engine and transmission, and many broke down. The most significant event from this engagement was that one of the Tigers became stuck in swampy ground and had to be abandoned. Captured largely intact, it enabled the Soviets to study the design and prepare countermeasures.

The 503rd Heavy Panzer Battalion was deployed to the Don Front in the autumn of 1942, but arrived too late to participate in Operation Winter Storm, the attempt to relieve Stalingrad. It was subsequently engaged in heavy defensive fighting in the Rostov-on-Don and adjacent sectors in January and February 1943.

In the North African Campaign, the Tiger I first saw action during the Tunisian Campaign on 1 December 1942 east of Tebourba, when three Tigers attacked an olive grove 5 km west of Djedeida. The thick olive grove made visibility very limited and enemy tanks were engaged at close range. The Tigers were hit by a number of M3 Lee tanks firing at a range of 80 to 100 metres. Two of the Lees were knocked out in this action, and the Tiger tanks provided protection from enemy fire; which greatly increased the crews trust in the quality of the armour. The first loss to an Allied gun was on 20 January 1943 near Robaa, when a battery of the British 72nd Anti-Tank Regiment knocked out a Tiger with their 6-pounder (57 mm) anti-tank guns. Seven Tigers were immobilised by mines during the failed attack on Béja during Operation Ochsenkopf at the end of February.

Later actions

In July 1943, two heavy tank battalions (503rd and 505th) took part in Operation Citadel resulting in the Battle of Kursk with one battalion each on the northern (505th) and southern (503rd) flanks of the Kursk salient the operation was designed to encircle. However, the operation failed and the Germans were again put on the defensive. The resulting withdrawal led to the loss of many broken-down Tigers which were left un-recovered with battalions unable to do required maintenance or repairs.

On 11 April 1945, a Tiger I destroyed three M4 Sherman tanks and an armoured car advancing on a road. On 12 April 1945, a Tiger I (F02) destroyed two Comet tanks, one half-track and one scout car. This Tiger I was destroyed by a Comet tank of A Squadron of the 3rd Royal Tank Regiment on the next day without infantry support.

Mobility and reliability 

The tank's weight significantly limited its use of bridges. For this reason, the Tiger was built with water tight hatches and a snorkel device that allowed it to ford water obstacles four metres deep. The tank's weight also made driving through buildings risky, as the presence of a cellar could result in a sudden drop. Due to reliability problems with the Maybach HL 210 TRM P45, which was delivered within the first production batch of 250 Tigers, performance for its maximum power output at high gear ratio could not be fulfilled. Though the Maybach engines had a maximum of 3,000 rpm, crews were told in the Tigerfibel not to exceed 2,600 rpm. The engine limitation was alleviated only by the adoption of the Maybach HL 230. The turret could also be traversed manually, but this option was rarely used, except when the engine was turned off or sometimes for very small adjustments.

This was not recommended for normal operation, and was discouraged in training. Tiger crews report that typical march speed off-road was 10 km/h (6 mph). Thus, despite the Tiger being nearly twice as heavy, its speed was comparatively respectable. With the tank's very wide tracks, a design feature borrowed from the Soviet T-34, the Tiger had a lower ground pressure than many smaller tanks, such as the M4 Sherman.

The first production series Tiger Fgst Nr 250001 with Motor Nr 46052 was only run-in for 25 km by Henschel before being sent to Kummersdorf for testing. During a test drive on 28 May 1942, with only 52 km on the odometer, a blockage occurred in the steering gear. This Tiger quickly went through the original and two replacement engines (Motor Nr 46051 from July lst to 3rd, Motor Nr 46065 from 6 to 8 July) and was fitted with a fourth motor, Nr 46066, after 13 July. By 3 August 1942, this Tiger had covered a total of 1046 km; by 31 March 1943 a total of 5623 km; and by 31 July 1943 a total of 7736 km.These figures clearly demonstrate that once the Tiger had overcome its teething troubles, it could withstand a lot of purposefully administered abuse during test programmes.

The sPzAbt 501 noted in Combat Report No.6 dated 3 May 1943:

The 13.(Tiger) Kompanie/Panzer-Regiment Großdeutschland reported on their experience in employing the Tiger from 7 to 19 March 1943:

Tiger I tanks needed a high degree of support. It required two or sometimes three of the standard German Sd.Kfz. 9 Famo heavy recovery half-track tractors to tow it. Tiger crews often resorted to using another Tiger to tow the damaged vehicle, but this was not recommended as it often caused overheating and engine breakdown. The low-mounted sprocket limited the obstacle clearance height. The tracks also had a tendency to override the rear sprocket, resulting in immobilisation. If a track overrode and jammed, two Tigers were normally needed to tow the tank. The jammed track was also a big problem itself, since due to high tension, it was often impossible to split the track by removing the track pins. The track sometimes had to be blown apart with a small explosive charge.

The average reliability of the Tiger tank in the second half of 1943 was similar to that of the Panther, 36%, compared to the 48% of the Panzer IV and the 65% of the StuG III. From May 1944 to March 1945, the reliability of the Tiger tank was comparable to the Panzer IV. With an average of 70%, the Tiger's operational availability on the Western Front, was better than 62% of Panthers. On the Eastern Front, 65% of Tigers were operationally available, compared to the 71% of Panzer IVs and 65% of Panthers.

Tactical organization

Tigers were usually employed in separate heavy tank battalions (schwere Panzer-Abteilung) under army command. These battalions would be deployed to critical sectors, either for breakthrough operations or, more typically, counter-attacks. A few favoured divisions, such as the Grossdeutschland, and the 1st SS Leibstandarte Adolf Hitler, 2nd SS Das Reich, and 3rd SS Totenkopf Panzergrenadier Divisions at Kursk, had a Tiger company in their tank regiments. The Grossdeutschland Division had its Tiger company increased to a battalion as the III Panzer Battalion of the Panzer Regiment Grossdeutschland. 3rd SS Totenkopf retained its Tiger I company through the entire war. 1st SS and 2nd SS had their Tiger companies taken away and incorporated into the 101st SS Tiger Battalion, which was part of 1st SS Panzer Corps.

The Tiger was originally designed to be an offensive breakthrough weapon, but by the time it went into action, the military situation had changed dramatically, and its main use was on the defensive, as a mobile anti-tank and infantry gun support weapon. Tactically, this also meant moving the Tiger units constantly to parry breakthroughs, causing excessive mechanical wear. As a result, Tiger battalions rarely entered combat at full strength.

Against the Soviet and Western Allied production numbers, even a 10:1 kill ratio was not sufficient. These numbers must be set against the opportunity cost of the expensive Tiger. Every Tiger cost as much to build as four Sturmgeschütz III assault guns. (70,016 € or 72,068 USD Minus inflation)

Allied response

British response

The British had observed the gradual increase in German AFV armour and firepower since 1940 and had anticipated the need for more powerful anti-tank guns. Work on the 76.2 mm calibre Ordnance QF 17 pounder had begun in late 1940 and in 1942 100 early-production guns were rushed to North Africa to help counter the new Tiger threat. The gun carriage had not yet been developed, and the guns were mounted on the carriages of 25-pounder gun-howitzers and were known by the code name "Pheasant".

Efforts were hastened to get cruiser tanks armed with 17-pounder guns into operation. The Cruiser Mk VIII Challenger (A30) was already at the prototype stage in 1942, but this tank had relatively weaker armor with a front hull thickness of 64 mm. In the end, it was produced and deployed in limited numbers (around 200 were ordered in 1943), though crews liked it for its high speed. The extemporised Sherman Firefly, armed with the 17-pounder, proved to be an excellent anti-tank weapon, but the gun lacked general purpose capability until later in the war. Fireflies were successfully used against Tigers; in one engagement, a single Firefly destroyed three Tigers in 12 minutes with five rounds. Sherman Fireflies were deployed one per troop of four 75mm armed standard Shermans. The Germans learned to target Fireflies, so the gun barrel of the Firefly was painted to look like a standard M3 75mm gun. This was partially effective.  Over 2,000 Fireflies were built during the war. Five different 17-pounder-armed British designs saw combat during the war: the Challenger, the A34 Comet (using the related QF 77mm HV), the Sherman Firefly, the 17pdr SP Achilles (upgunned M10 GMC), and the 17pdr SP Archer self-propelled gun, while one more, the A41 Centurion, was about to enter service as the European war ended. In 1944 the British introduced an APDS round for the 17-pounder, which increased penetration performance considerably.

Soviet response

Initially, the Soviets responded to the Tiger I by restarting production of the 57 mm ZiS-2 anti-tank gun (production was stopped in 1941 in favour of cheaper and more versatile alternatives – e.g. the ZiS-3 – as the gun's performance was excessive for early German armour). The ZiS-2 had better armour penetration than the 76 mm F-34 tank gun used by most Red Army tanks, or the ZiS-3 76 mm divisional cannon, but was still inadequate against Tigers. A small number of T-34s were again fitted with a tank version of the ZiS-2, the ZiS-4, but it could not fire an adequate high-explosive round, making it an unsuitable tank gun.

Firing trials of the new 85 mm D-5T also had proved disappointing. Several captured German Tiger I tanks were shipped to Chelyabinsk, where they were subjected to 85 mm fire from various angles. The 85 mm gun could not reliably penetrate the Tiger I's armour except at ranges within the lethal envelope of the Tiger I's own 88 mm gun. It was still initially used on the SU-85 self-propelled gun (based on a T-34 chassis) from August 1943. The production of KV heavy tanks armed with the 85 mm D-5T in an IS-85 turret was also started. There was a short production run of 148 KV-85 tanks, which were sent to the front beginning in September 1943 with production ending by December 1943. By early 1944, the T-34/85 appeared; this up-gunned T-34 matched the SU-85's firepower, but with the advantage of mounting the gun in a turret. It also matched the firepower of the heavier IS-85 tank in a more cost effective package resulting in a repetition of the events which heralded the decline of KV-1 production. The IS was subsequently rearmed with the 122 mm D-25T, which with BR–471 AP rounds was capable of going through the Tiger's armour from 1,200 m, and with the improved BR–471B APHEBC rounds at over 2,000 m. The redundant SU-85 was replaced by the SU-100, mounting a 100 mm D-10 tank gun, that could penetrate 149 mm of vertical armour plate at 1,000 m.

In May 1943, the Red Army deployed the SU-152, which was replaced in 1944 by the ISU-152. These self-propelled guns both mounted the large, 152 mm howitzer-gun. The SU-152 was intended to be a close-support gun for use against German fortifications rather than armour; however, it shared among the later fielded ISU-152, the nickname Zveroboy ("beast killer"), for its rare ability to knock out German heavy tanks. Its high-explosive rounds would destroy anything that was attached to the outside of the tank, and had a knack for immobilizing any tank it hit. The sheer force of the shell meant that at certain points it could knock off the turrets of the Tiger series. However, the size and weight of the ammunition meant both vehicles had a low rate of fire.

US response

The US Army hesitated to place 76 mm M1 guns in action even when they were already available, as combat through early 1944 indicated that the 75 mm M3 was more than adequate for handling the German tank threat. This conclusion was partly based on the correct estimate that Tigers would be encountered in relatively small numbers, and on the assumption that anti-tank gun-fire (as in Tunisia and Sicily) rather than tanks could knock them out. But as early as 1942, the US was already planning and testing the rearming of the M4 Sherman with the 76mm gun, expecting to encounter heavier German armor later in the war.

Operators
 – main operator
 – 13 examples given by Germany in 1944 to the First Hungarian Army fighting under German command on the Eastern Front. A lack of repair capabilities led to the destruction of most of the tanks. 3 damaged Tigers were sent back to Germany.
 – used captured Tigers in the Saint Nazaire salient and the Allied offensive into Germany
 – two captured in 1944 after King Michael's Coup

Survivors

Running

On 21 April 1943, a Tiger I of the 504th German heavy tank battalion, with turret number 131, was captured on a hill called Djebel Djaffa in Tunisia. A 6-pounder solid shot from a Churchill tank of the British 48th Royal Tank Regiment hit the Tiger's gun barrel and ricocheted into its turret ring, jamming its traverse and wounding the commander. The crew bailed out and the tank was captured. After repairs, the tank was sent to England for a thorough inspection.

The captured tank was officially handed over to the Bovington Tank Museum by the British Ministry of Supply on 25 September 1951. In June 1990, the tank was removed from display at the museum and work began on its restoration. This was carried out both by the museum and the Army Base Repair Organisation and involved an almost complete disassembly of the tank. The Maybach HL230 engine from the museum's Tiger II was installed (the Tiger's original Maybach HL210 had been sectioned for display), along with a modern fire-suppressant system in the engine compartment. In December 2003, Tiger 131 returned to the museum, restored and in running condition. This Tiger was used in the film Fury, the first time an original, fully mechanically operable Tiger I has appeared in a movie since World War II. The fire suppression system was removed as it interfered with engine maintenance and was too obtrusive.

Others
Given the low number of just over 1,300 Tiger Is produced during World War II, very few survived the war and the subsequent post-war scrapping drives. Many large components have been salvaged over the years, but the discovery of a more or less and generally complete vehicle has so far eluded armour enthusiasts and tank collectors. In addition to Tiger 131, eight other Tiger I tanks survive:

 Musée des Blindés in Saumur, France. Indoor exhibit in good condition. Mid-production (1944) version with overlapping 'steel'-type roadwheels adopted from the Tiger II and fitted with the narrow transport tracks. This Tiger was part of the 2nd company of the SS Heavy Panzer Battalion 102 which fought in the Cauville sector and was later abandoned by her crew after a mechanical breakdown. She was recommissioned as Colmar with the 2nd squadron of the Free French 6th Cuirassier Regiment and joined the new unit in fighting all the way back to Germany.
 Vimoutiers in Normandy, France. The renowned "Vimoutiers Tiger tank". Abandoned and then destroyed (to prevent enemy capture) by its German crew in August 1944. An outdoor monument in poor condition due to the effect of time and the elements (many original parts such as hatches and both rear exhaust pipes missing).
 Kubinka Tank Museum in Moscow, Russia. In good condition; displayed as an indoor exhibit (although the outermost row of four roadwheels are missing on this vehicle).
 Military-Historical Museum of Lenino-Snegiri in Russia. In very bad condition; displayed outdoors. This tank was a former firing-range target and has been badly shot-at and cut up (damage include broken running gear and multiple shell-holes on its armour).
 Tiger 712 [Hull Number 250031] of the 501st Heavy Panzer Battalion is a part of the United States Army Armor & Cavalry Museum in Fort Benning, Georgia, the US. In good condition; formerly displayed outdoors, it has since been moved indoors. This vehicle appears to have had its left turret and upper-hull sides partially cut open (possibly for vehicle studies and analysis) during or after WWII but the cut openings have since been covered up by false metal plates.
 Private Collector – Long Island, United States – The "Hobeig Tiger" (marked as 231) is a Tiger reconstructed by a Mr Hobeig from various components sourced from the Trun Scrapyard in Normandy, with the wheels and gun coming from Kurland (in Latvia). Prior to December 2016, it was on display at the German Panzer Museum in Munster. 
The Australian Armour and Artillery Museum – This Tiger, restored in 2021, is an externally complete Tiger using battlefield relics and a proportionally small amount of replica plate/components, similar to the Hoebig Tiger, and the Wheatcroft Tigers
The Wheatcroft Collection – significant numbers of components to assemble 2 Tigers made from a mixture of new replacement and original relic Tiger pieces. The re-construction of one stalled several years ago, with little information coming from the collection in regard to the progress of the project. Controversially, Kevin Wheatcroft has maintained that the restorations would utilise 100% original components and parts; however, photos obtained within "the secure zone" (Wheatcroft safe storage and workshop facility) show clearly that more than 60% of the upper deck, and the entire engine area has been fabricated from new materials.

Tanks of comparable role, performance and era
 Soviet KV-1 and IS-2
 American M26 Pershing and M4A3E2 76mm
 British Churchill tank

See also
 List of WWII Maybach engines

Notes

References

Citations

Bibliography

External links

 Bovington Tank Museum Tiger and Restoration
 Tiger I Information Center – Comprehensive website about the Tiger I
 Article, "New German Heavy Tank" from U.S. Intelligence Bulletin, June 1943
 Tiger survivors – PDF, Surviving Tiger Tanks
 Tiger and Tiger II sections from Handbook on German Military Forces
 Tiger I encyclopedia
 Tiger 1 Torsion bar

Heavy tanks of Germany
World War II heavy tanks
World War II tanks of Germany
History of the tank
Military vehicles introduced from 1940 to 1944